The Rebel Yell Open was a PGA Tour satellite event that played for one year at the Holston Hills Country Club in Knoxville, Tennessee; a 7,009-yard, Donald Ross-designed course opened in 1927. The tournament, which was held in April 1968 opposite the Masters Tournament, was organized by tournament director Lonnie Nolan. The title sponsor was the bourbon company of the same name.

It was won by 31-year-old Las Vegas, Nevada club professional Larry Mowry in a sudden-death playoff over Chris Blocker. The winners share was $2,800.

Winner

References

Former PGA Tour events
Golf in Tennessee
Sports in Knoxville, Tennessee